Even with only 5 Jews left in Cairo, Egypt as of July 2019, there are still some synagogues in Cairo.

The Egyptian Jews constitute both one of the oldest and youngest Jewish communities in the World. The historic core of the indigenous community consisted mainly of Arabic-speaking Rabbanites and Karaites. After their expulsion from Spain, more Sephardi and Karaite Jews began to emigrate to Egypt and their numbers increased significantly with the growth of trading prospects after the opening of the Suez Canal in 1869. As a result, Jews from all over the territories of the Ottoman Empire as well as Italy and Greece started to settle in the main cities of Egypt, where they thrived. The Ashkenazi community, mainly confined to Cairo's Darb al-Barabira quarter, began to arrive in the aftermath of the waves of pogroms that hit Europe in the latter part of the 19th century. In the late 1950s, Egypt began to expel its Jewish population (estimated at between 75,000 and 80,000 in 1948), also sequestering Jewish-owned property at this time. In 2016, the spiritual leader of the Jewish community in the city of Cairo, Magda Tania Haroun, stated that there were 6 Jews remaining in the city, all women over the age of 65. In July 2019, there are only 5 Jews left in Cairo. It's estimated that only 18 Egyptian Jews remain in the entire country, with most of them in the city of Alexandria.

Ben Ezra Synagogue

Ets Hayim Synagogue
The temple was built in 1900. The synagogue is located in Daher district. The marble floor of the temple was damaged during the earthquake of October 12, 1992. The synagogue is protected by the Egyptian supreme antiquity council. The temple is guarded by a police officer. The synagogue was used for the last time in 1967.

Maimonides Synagogue
The Maimonides Synagogue (in ) (transliterated: Beit HaKneset HaRambam: (in ) also known as the Rav Moshe synagogue is a historic synagogue located in Cairo, Egypt. A synagogue has existed in the area since the 10th century and was later called by the name of the famous Jewish philosopher, rabbi and doctor Maimonides, after his arrival, around 1168, as a result of his exile in Córdoba, Spain, at the hands of the Almohades. It is believed that the original tomb of Maimonides is located within the building. In March 2010, the Egyptian government completed the restoration of the current building, which dates from the end of the 19th century.

Sha'ar HaShamayim Synagogue
The Sha'ar Hashamayim Synagogue (in ) is located in the city of Cairo in Egypt. The synagogue was also known as Ismailia Temple and the synagogue at Adly Street. His historical leader was the great rabbi Chaim Nahum. In 2008, the synagogue celebrated its 100th anniversary. The synagogue was built in a style similar to the ancient Egyptian temples, and once it was the largest building on the boulevard.

References